Caravelí Province is one of eight provinces in the Arequipa Region of Peru.

Political divisions
The province is divided into thirteen districts which are:

 Acarí (Acarí)
 Atico (Atico)
 Atiquipa (Atiquipa)
 Bella Unión (Bella Unión)
 Cahuacho (Cahuacho)
 Caravelí (Caravelí)
 Chala (Chala)
 Chaparra (Achanizo)
 Huanuhuanu (Tocota)
 Jaqui (Jaqui)
 Lomas (Lomas)
 Quicacha (Quicacha)
 Yauca (Yauca)

Ethnic groups 
The province is inhabited by indigenous citizens of Aymara and Quechua descent. Spanish, however, is the language which the majority of the population (84.24%) learnt to speak in childhood, 14.49% of the residents started speaking using the Quechua language and  1.07 	% using Aymara (2007 Peru Census).

See also 
 Kukuli

Sources

External links
  Municipal website

Provinces of the Arequipa Region